Pleurotomella cancellata is a species of sea snail, a marine gastropod mollusk in the family Raphitomidae.

Description

Distribution
This species was found in the Kurile-Kamchatka Trench, Northern Pacific.

References

 Sysoev, Av. "Ultra-abyssal findings of mollusks of the family Turridae (Gastropoda, Toxoglossa) in the Pacific Ocean." Zoologichesky Zhurnal 67.7 (1988): 965–973.

External links
 

cancellata
Gastropods described in 1988